Elizabeth Georgiana Jeffreys (16 January 1853 – 18 July 1885) was a New Zealand artist.

Biography 
Jeffreys was born in Dunedin on 16 January 1853, the daughter of Reverend Charles Jeffreys and Frances Hagell. Her sister, Frances McGoun (née Jeffreys) was also an artist, and her uncle, Julius Jeffreys, was a noted surgeon and medical pioneer.

Several of Jeffreys' drawings and watercolours of New Zealand landscapes are now in the Hocken collections at the University of Otago. Several are dated from 1865 to 1867 when Jeffreys was a teenager.

Jeffreys died on 18 July 1885 in Brightwater, Nelson, aged 32.

References 

1853 births
1885 deaths
Artists from Dunedin
New Zealand women artists
19th-century New Zealand women artists
Valpy-Fulton-Jeffreys family